Tim Kidd  was the UK Chief Commissioner for The Scout Association. As the Chief Commissioner he was the top administrative volunteer of The Scout Association. The UK Chief Commissioner acts as the association's Deputy Chief Scout and appoints a team of chief commissioners and UK Commissioners who are responsible for programmes in their respective fields.

Career
Tim Kidd works in information technology. He is an Executive Director in a not-for-profit company called JISC whose vision is for the UK to be the most digitally-advanced higher education, further education and research nation in the world. Tim is responsible for bringing together Jisc's digital technology related people, organisations, strategy, services and operations. He ensures Jisc's digital IT capabilities and expertise are applied cost effectively and imaginatively – making a real and sustained difference to research and education in the UK. October 2017 marked his 20th anniversary working at Jisc and what keeps him there is very simple – “I know that what we do makes a real difference to students, to universities, colleges and research centres, and to the UK economy. Without Jisc’s work to maintain and advance the national research and education network, a lot of research at universities would either be impossible, or it would cost the state more, and without the research we wouldn’t have UK universities up there in the world rankings”
.

Scouting
Kidd's first involvement in Scouting was as a Cub. He has served in numerous leadership roles including Scout Leader, Assistant County Commissioner (Scouts), District Commissioner and County Commissioner. Prior to his current position Kidd was UK Commissioner for Adult Support for four years. Kidd replaced Wayne Bulpitt to become the UK Chief Commissioner in August 2016, serving until the appointment of Carl Hankinson in September 2021.

Kidd was appointed Officer of the Order of the British Empire (OBE) in the 2016 Birthday Honours for services to young people through the Scout Movement.

References

Living people
Officers of the Order of the British Empire
Chief Commissioners of The Scout Association
Year of birth missing (living people)